The 2020 Taiwan Mulan Football League season was the 7th season of the Taiwan Mulan Football League, the top division of women's football in Taiwan. The regular season began on 11 April and concluded on 7 November 2020.

Teams

Table

Results table

Mulan League Cup

Statistics

Top scorers

Top assists

Clean sheets

References

External links
Chinese Taipei Football Association official website

2020
Taiwan
Taiwan
2020 in Taiwanese football